Gianluca Marzullo (born 4 January 1991) is an Italian-German football player who plays for Rot Weiss Ahlen in the Regionalliga West.

References

External links

1991 births
Living people
German footballers
German people of Italian descent
Arminia Bielefeld players
Bayer 04 Leverkusen II players
FC Gütersloh 2000 players
1. FC Lokomotive Leipzig players
Rot Weiss Ahlen players
SC Verl players
SC Westfalia Herne players
A.C.R. Messina players
Wuppertaler SV players
Serie D players
3. Liga players
Regionalliga players
Association football forwards